The rice paddy snake (Hypsiscopus plumbea), also known as grey water snake, Boie's mud snake, yellow or orange bellied water snake, lead water snake or plumbeous water snake is a species of mildly venomous, rear-fanged snake endemic to South Asia. It is somewhat common, and is one of the most widespread species of water snake in Asia.

Taxonomy
The species epithet, plumbea, means 'lead-like' and refers to the snake's greyish upper body.

DNA evidence suggests that this taxon might be a species complex.

Description
This snake feeds readily on small fish, frogs, and occasionally small lizards. It has countershading coloration, which is dark brown to grey in the upper part of its body, and light colored white to yellowish color at the bottom of its body. In some populations, the upper part may be greenish, and dark spots along the vertebral line may also occur. The head isIt is mainly nocturnal.

Distribution and habitat
The rice paddy snake is found in the Andaman Islands (India), Myanmar, Thailand, Cambodia, Laos, Malaysia, Indonesia, Vietnam, southern China, and Taiwan.

The rice paddy snake is a common and abundant species associated with a variety of wet habitats.

References

Further reading

Boie, F. (1827). "Bemerkungen über Merrem's Versuch eines Systems der Amphibien, 1. Lieferung: Ophidier ". Isis van Oken [Jena] 20: 508–566. (Homalopsis plumbea, new species, p. 550).
Boulenger, G.A. (1896). Catalogue of the Snakes in the British Museum (Natural History). Volume III., Containing the Colubridæ (Opisthoglyphæ and Proteroglyphæ), ... London: Trustees of the British Museum (Natural History). (Taylor and Francis, printers). xiv + 727 pp. + Plates I-XXV. (Hypsirhina plumbea, pp. 5–6).
Das, Indraneil. (2006). A Photographic Guide to Snakes and Other Reptiles of Borneo. Sanibel Island, Florida: Ralph Curtis Books. 144 pp. . (Enhydris plumbea, p. 34).
Ghodke, Sameer; Harry V. Andrews. (2002). Enhydris plumbea (Boie, 1827) (Serpentes: Colubridae: Homalopsinae), a new record for India. Hamadryad 26 (2): 373–375. [2001]
Gray, J.E. (1842). Monographic Synopsis of the Water Snakes, or the Family Hydridae. Zoological Miscellany 1842: 59–68. (Hypsirhina plumbea, p. 66).
Smith, M.A. (1943). The Fauna of British India, Ceylon and Burma, Including the Whole of the Indo-Chinese Sub-region. Reptilia and Amphibia. Vol. III.—Serpentes. London: Secretary of State for India. (Taylor and Francis, printers). xii + 583 pp. (Enhydris plumbea, pp. 382–383, Figure 122).
Stejneger, Leonard. (1907). Herpetology of Japan and Adjacent Territory. United States National Museum Bulletin 58. Washington, District of Columbia: Smithsonian Institution. xx + 577 pp. (Enhydris plumbea, pp. 300–302, Figures 260–262).
Voris, Harold K.; Karns, Daryl R. (1996). Habitat utilization, movements, and activity patterns of Enhydris plumbea (Serpentes: Homalopsinae) in a rice paddy wetland in Borneo. Herpetological Natural History 4 (2): 111–126.

Colubrids
Reptiles of Cambodia
Snakes of China
Reptiles of India
Snakes of Indonesia
Reptiles of Laos
Snakes of Malaysia
Snakes of Myanmar
Reptiles of Taiwan
Snakes of Thailand
Snakes of Vietnam
Reptiles described in 1827
Taxa named by Friedrich Boie
Reptiles of Borneo